Katharevousa (literally "purifying [language]") is a conservative form of the Modern Greek language conceived in the late 18th century as both a literary language and a compromise between Ancient Greek and the contemporary vernacular, Demotic Greek. Originally, it was widely used for both literary and official purposes, though sparingly in daily language. In the 20th century, it was increasingly adopted for official and formal purposes, until minister of education Georgios Rallis made Demotic Greek the official language of Greece in 1976, and in 1982 Prime Minister Andreas Papandreou abolished the polytonic system of writing for both Demotic and Katharevousa.

Katharevousa was conceived by the intellectual and revolutionary leader Adamantios Korais (1748–1833). A graduate of the University of Montpellier, Korais spent most of his life as an expatriate in Paris. As a classical scholar credited with both laying the foundations of Modern Greek literature and a major figure in the Greek Enlightenment, he was repelled by the Byzantine and subsequent influence on Greek society, and was a fierce critic of the clergy and their alleged subservience to the Ottoman Empire. He held that education was a prerequisite to Greek liberation.

Part of Katharevousa's purpose was to serve as a compromise solution for the struggle between the "archaists" demanding full reversion to archaic Greek, and the "modernists".

History

Although Katharevousa was introduced relatively recently, the concept of a conservative literary version of Greek had been present since the times of Koine Greek. There had always existed a tendency towards a state of diglossia between the Attic literary language and the constantly developing spoken Koine, which eventually evolved into Demotic Greek. Medieval Greek texts and documents of the Byzantine Empire were almost always written in conservative literary Greek. Examples of texts written in vernacular Greek prior to the 13th century are very rare. It can be argued that the establishment of Katharevousa was an official declaration and standardization of the conservative form of Greek, which had already existed in one way or another. The first known use of the term Katharevousa is in a work by the Greek polymath Nikephoros Theotokis, in 1796.

Katharevousa was widely used in public documents and whatever was conceived as work of formal activity by Greek scholars. The name Katharevousa  implies a pure form of Greek as it might hypothetically have evolved from ancient Greek without external influences, while in its modern connotation the word has come to mean "formal language". In later years, Katharevousa was used for official and formal purposes (such as politics, letters, official documents, and newscasting), while Demotic Greek (δημοτική, dimotiki) or popular Greek, was the daily language. This created a diglossic situation whereby most of the Greek population was excluded from the public sphere and advancement in education unless they conformed to Katharevousa. 

In 1976, Demotic was made the official language, and in 1982 Andreas Papandreou abolished the polytonic system of writing; by the end of the 20th century full Katharevousa in its earlier form had become obsolete. Much of the vocabulary of Katharevousa and its grammatical and syntactical rules have influenced the Demotic language, so that the project's emphasis has made an observable contribution to the language as it is used today. Modern Greek might be argued to be a combination of the original Demotic and the traditional Katharevousa as stressed in the 19th century, also with institutional input from Koine Greek. Among Katharevousa's later contributions are the promotion of classically based compounds to describe items and concepts that did not exist in earlier times, such as "newspaper", "police", "automobile", "aeroplane" and "television", rather than borrowing new words directly from other languages.

Etymology 
Katharevousa means 'cleansing, purifying', the feminine present participle of the verb katharévo. (The term is thus cognate with English catharsis.)

Present-day use
The Church of Greece and other churches of the Greek Orthodox tradition still use Katharevousa in official communications.

Text sample
This is a text sample of Katharevousa from the Great Greek Encyclopedia, published in 1930. The text relates to Adamantios Korais's relations with the Greek Church. It is rendered in Demotic and translated into English.

English translation: His expatriation from Greece was a cause for many unjust judgments as regards situations and people, and mainly for his behaviour towards the clergy, which was discussed above. If he had lived in Greece and been in contact with the clergy and known closely not only its turpitude but also its virtues, not only would he have contributed greatly to correcting some of the problems within the Church, but also would not have listened to all that he listened to due to his exaggerated sentiments against the clergy.

See also
Demotic Greek
Diglossia
Greek diacritics
Greek language question
Linguistic purism

 Similar movements
Landsmål, Nynorsk, Riksmål (Norwegian)
Revival of the Hebrew language
Language reform and modern Turkish

References

Languages attested from the 19th century
Varieties of Modern Greek
Linguistic purism
Language revival
Standard languages
Greek words and phrases